Density 21.5 is a composition for solo flute written by Edgard Varèse in 1936 and revised in 1946. The piece was composed at the request of Georges Barrère for the premiere of his platinum flute, the density of platinum being close to 21.5 grams per cubic centimetre.

Structure
AllMusic's Sean Hickey writes, "According to the composer, Density 21.5 is based on two melodic ideas—one modal, one atonal—and all of the subsequent material is generated from these two themes. Despite the inherent limitations of writing for an unaccompanied melodic instrument, Varèse expertly explores new areas of space and time, utilizing registral contrasts to effect polyphonic continuity."

George Perle analyses the piece both harmonically and motivically, and describes its background structure. Formally, he says, the piece consists of two parts of nearly equal length, the end of the first section being bars 24–28. The piece uses interval cycles, "inherently non-diatonic symmetrical elements". The opening ten bars outline a tritone, C–G, itself further divided into minor thirds (by E) with the upper minor third differentiated by a passing tone, F, that is lacking in the lower minor third. Thus the diminished seventh chord, or rather C31, interval cycle, partitions the octave, and "places Varèse with Scriabin and the Schoenberg circle among the revolutionary composers whose work initiates the beginning of a new mainstream tradition in the music of our century".

He continues: "the concept of the perfect fourth or fifth as a referential interval relative to which the tritone requires resolution ... has no relevance at all to Density 21.5". However, there still is a reference point, first in the differentiated minor third, C–(E–F–G)–B. The second tritone, created by C31, E–B, C64, is hierarchically related to the C–G tritone, C61. Thus regristral placement is taken into consideration, creating pitches rather than pitch classes. "My reason for stressing this hierchical distinction between C61, and C64 is that there is a constant shifting of such distinctions, a constant reinterpretation of structural notes as passing notes and vice versa, and it is through this ambiguity, this perpetual change of function, that the composition unfolds. This is what the composition is ".

The piece proceeds to outline new tritones, D–G, D–A, and then pauses, in measures 13–14, B–E, which is part of C3, "right back where he had started", however, "the relation between the two tritones of C31 becomes not less but more ambiguous". He sees the close of the first section as the attainment of the e–c missing from the E–G of bars 13–17. However, the B which divides G–D require an F, "if we assume that the G–B–D collection represents an incomplete diminished-seventh chord, that the work is based on structural relations derived from the interval-3 cycle, and that this implies a tendency for each partition of the cycle to be completely represented".

From the second beat of bar 56 until the end, however, the piece uses an interval-2 cycle, C2, which still produces tritones, but partitions them differently. E–B is paired with D–(G) and C–F, rather than C–G. The only odd interval (outside the interval-2 cycle) is the F–C, "which transfers us from C20 to C21. And here, in the last two notes of Density 21.5 we at last find B paired with its tritone associate ... only as a consequence of an entirely new harmonic direction that the work takes in its closing bars." However, "the music of the 'common practice' offers many exemplars of such altogether unexpected digressions just as a work is drawing to its close, followed by a return, for the final cadence, to a consequently more emphatic confirmation of the structural relations implied in the body of the work."

In the foreground, the head motif, presumably Varèse's atonal "idea", does not contain a minor third or tritone, and thus each pitch, F–E–F, is a member of a different interval-3 cycle or diminished-seventh chord. The structural importance of each pitch is then dependent on its context, at which level it partitions the octave, the tritone which divides the octave, the minor third which divides the tritone, the major second which divides the major third, the minor second which divides the major second. "This variable relation of the basic motive of Density 21.5 to the harmonic structure of the piece, and its function in articulating and clarifying the formal design, are exactly what we would expect and take for granted in the relation between motive and background in traditional tonal music."

Defined by the head motif and its repetition in bar 3, is "characterized by its relative pitch content (a three-note segment of the semitonal scale), by its interval order—down a half step and up a whole step—and by its rhythm (two sixteenth-notes on the beat followed by a tied eighth-note). This definitive version of the motive, combining all three attributes, occurs at only three different points (not counting the repetition in bar 3), each initiating a new and major formal subdivision of the piece."

Timothy Kloth interprets the head motif or, "the molecular structure around which the entire composition is cast," as being the five-pitch-class motive which opens the piece, F–E–F–C–G. This is divided into two trichords: "cell X" (also Perle's head motif, F–E–F) and "cell Y", F–C–G.

Recordings
George Perle and Marc Wilkinson, in writing, and Harvey Sollberger, in recording, all interpret the fourth note in bar twenty-three as a B natural.

The piece has been recorded and released on:
 Members of the Columbia Symphony Orchestra, directed by Robert Craft – Varèse: Density 21.5, Hyperprism, Intégrales, Ionisation, Octandre, Poème Electronique (1959) CBS Masterworks – CBS 60286.
 Severino Gazelloni, flute (1967) WERGO WER 60029, Series: Große Interpreten neuer Musik.
 Ensemble Instrumental de Musique Contemporaine de Paris, directed by Konstantin Simonovitch – Varese: Deserts / Hyperprism / Integrales / Density 21.5 (1971) La Voix De Son Maître 2 C 061-10875 Y.
Edgard Varèse: The Complete Works (1994/1998). Performed by Jacques Zoon. Decca London Polygram 289 460 208–2. Assistance and advised from Professor Chou Wen-chung, who worked closely with Varèse.
Harvey Sollberger
Philippe Bernold, Alexandre Tharaud, The Solo Flute in the 20th Century (2008), Harmonia Mundi Musique d'Abord HMA1951710
Claire Chase, Density (2013) New Focus Recordings

Notes and references
Notes

References

Sources

Further reading
Babbitt, Milton (1966). "Edgard Varèse: A Few Observations of His Music". Perspectives of New Music 4, No. 2 (Spring–Summer): 14–22.
Bernard, Jonathan W. (1981). "Pitch/Register in the Music of Edgard Varèse". Music Theory Spectrum 3 (Spring): 1–25.
Bernard, Jonathan W. (1986). "On Density 21.5: A Response to Nattiez". Music Analysis 5, nos. 2–3 (July–October): 207–231.
Brouwer, Candace (1997–98). "Pathway, Blockage, and Containment in Density 21.5". Theory and Practice 22–23:35–54.
Guck, Marion (1984). "A Flow of Energy: Density 21.5". Perspectives of New Music 23, no. 1 (Autumn–Winter): 334–347.
Kresky, Geoffrey (1984). "A Path Through Density". Perspectives of New Music 23, no. 1 (Autumn–Winter): 318–333.
Marvin, Elizabeth West (1991). "The Perception of Rhythm in Non-Tonal Music: Rhythmic Contours in the Music of Edgard Varèse". Music Theory Spectrum 13, no. 1 (Spring): 61–78.
Nattiez, Jean-Jacques (1982). "Varèse's Density 21.5: A Study in Semiological Analysis", translated by Anna Barry. Music Analysis 1, no. 3 (October): 243–340.
Siddons, James (1984). "On the Nature of Melody in Varèse's Density 21.5". Perspectives of New Music 23, no. 1 (Autumn–Winter): 298–316.
Tenney, James, and Larry Polansky (1980). "Temporal Gestalt Perception in Music: A Metric Space Model". Journal of Music Theory 24:205–241.

External links
Performance of Density 21.5: John McMurtery, flute

Atonal compositions
Compositions by Edgard Varèse
Modernist compositions
Solo flute pieces
1936 compositions
1946 compositions
Compositions that use extended techniques